Lolita Torres (born Beatriz Mariana Torres; 26 March 1930 – 14 September 2002) was an Argentine film actress and singer (contralto).

She began her career at age 11, performing folk songs in a theater in Buenos Aires. In 1944 she began acting in films, eventually appearing in seventeen films during "Argentine cinema's 'golden years.'"

She was so popular in the Soviet Union, that many newborn girls were named 'Lolita' after her tour there in 1963.
In 2002 she was honored as "Ciudadano Ilustre de la Ciudad de Buenos Aires" ("Illustrious Citizen of the City of Buenos Aires").

The Plaza Lolita Torres in her birthplace of Avellaneda is named for her.

Selected filmography
 La danza de la fortuna (The Dance of Fortune) (1944)
 Ritmo, sal y pimienta (Rhythm, Salt and Pepper) (1951)

 El mucamo de la niña (The Girl's Servant) (1951)
 La niña de fuego (The Fire Girl) (1952)
 La mejor del colegio (The Best Girl of College) (1953)
 La edad del amor (The Age of Love) (1954)

 Más pobre que una laucha (Poor as a Church Mouse,"very poor" – Spanish proverb)(1955)
 Un novio para Laura (A Bridegroom for Laura) (1955)
 Amor a primera vista (Love at First Sight) (1956)
 Novia para dos (A Bride for Two Men) (1956)
 La hermosa mentira (The Beautiful Lie) (1958)
 La maestra enamorada (The Teacher in Love) (1961)
 Cuarenta años de novios (Forty Years of Love) (1963)
 Ritmo nuevo, vieja ola (New Rhythm, old Wave) (1965)
 Pimienta (Pepper) (1966)
 Joven, viuda y estanciera (Young Girl, Widow and Landowner) (1970)
 Allá en el Norte (Somewhere in the North) (1973)

Personal life
Torres was married twice. From her first marriage she had a son, from her second marriage she had four children, one of whom, Diego, is a world-famous singer.

References

Bibliography
 Plazaola, Luis Trelles. South American Cinema: Dictionary of Film Makers. La Editorial, UPR, 1989.

External links

1930 births
2002 deaths
People from Avellaneda
Argentine film actresses
20th-century Argentine actresses
Burials at La Chacarita Cemetery